, provisional designation , is a sub-kilometer asteroid on an eccentric orbit, classified as a near-Earth object and potentially hazardous asteroid of the Apollo group, approximately  in diameter. It was discovered on 31 December 2007, by astronomers of the Catalina Sky Survey conducted at the Catalina Station in Arizona, United States.

Orbit and classification 

 is an Apollo asteroid that crosses the orbit of Earth. Apollo's are the largest group of near-Earth objects with nearly 10 thousand known members. 

It orbits the Sun at a distance of 0.60–2.55 AU once every 2 years (722 days; semi-major axis of 1.58 AU). Its orbit has a high eccentricity of 0.62 and an inclination of 6° with respect to the ecliptic. This makes it also a Mars-crossing asteroid, as it crosses the orbit of the Red Planet at 1.66 AU, as well as a Venus-crosser due to its aphelion of less than 0.71 AU. The body's observation arc begins at Catalina with its official discovery observation in December 2007.

Close approaches 

It has an absolute magnitude of 21.0. Besides Earth, it also makes close approaches to Venus, Mars and the Moon.

Physical characteristics 

The body's spectral type is unknown. Near-Earth asteroids are often of a stony composition.

Diameter and albedo 

Based on a generic magnitude-to-diameter conversion,  measures  in diameter, for an absolute magnitude of 21.0, and an assumed albedo of 0.20 and 0.057, which represent typical values for stony and carbonaceous asteroids, respectively.

Rotation period 

As of 2018, no rotational lightcurve of  has been obtained from photometric observations. The body's rotation period, pole and shape remain unknown.

Numbering and naming 

This minor planet was numbered by the Minor Planet Center on 22 February 2016. As of 2018, it has not been named.

References

External links 
 MPEC 2008-A16 : 2007 YV56, Minor Planet Electronic Circular, 2 January 2008
 MPEC 2009-Y46 : 2007 YV56, Minor Planet Electronic Circular, 23 December 2009
 List of the Potentially Hazardous Asteroids (PHAs), Minor Planet Center
 PHA Close Approaches To The Earth, Minor Planet Center
 Asteroid Lightcurve Database (LCDB), query form (info )
 Discovery Circumstances: Numbered Minor Planets (455001)-(460000) – Minor Planet Center
 
 

Apollo asteroids
Discoveries by the Catalina Sky Survey
Potentially hazardous asteroids
20071231